Marija Dūdienė  (13 March 1927–14 October 2012) was a Lithuanian painter.

See also
List of Lithuanian painters

References

External links
 Bio at Vilniaus Aukionas

Lithuanian painters
1927 births
2012 deaths
Place of birth missing
Place of death missing